Seo Bum-june (born June 27, 1997) is a South Korean actor. He is recently known for his role as Lee Soo-jae in KBS2 television series It's Beautiful Now (2022) and as one of the current co-hosts of SBS music program, Inkigayo.

Personal life

Military service 
Seo served his mandatory military service as a social worker at the age of 21 for 2 years.

Filmography

Television series

Hosting

Awards and nominations

References

External links 
 Seo Bum-june at Hook Entertainment 
 

1997 births
Living people
21st-century South Korean male actors
South Korean male television actors
South Korean male web series actors